Public School 71K is a historic school building located in Williamsburg, Brooklyn, New York City. It was built in 1888–1889 to designs by James W. Naughton. It is a symmetrical three story, brick building with stone trim in the Second Empire style.  It features a tall central tower with a high mansard roof and original iron cresting.

It was listed on the National Register of Historic Places in 1982.

Today, the building serves as a Beis Rochel Satmar girls' school and a joy hall.

This building has an exact twin in Bedford-Stuyvesant, Brooklyn: the Excellence Charter School at 225 Patchen Ave.

See also 
List of New York City Landmarks
National Register of Historic Places listings in Kings County, New York

References

School buildings on the National Register of Historic Places in New York City
Public elementary schools in Brooklyn
New York City Designated Landmarks in Brooklyn
Second Empire architecture in New York City
School buildings completed in 1889
National Register of Historic Places in Brooklyn